Leon van Dalen (Papendrecht, 28 January 1979) is a Dutch association footballer in the position of midfielder, who played professionally in FC Dordrecht and FC Oss. He is also an education professional.

Career
After youth teams at VV Drechtstreek and FC Dordrecht, Leon van Dalen played in the Eerste Divisie for FC Dordrecht (1988–2004) and FC Oss (2004–2008). He continued to play football at ASWH and VV Drechtstreek. He is the father of two kids, Rens van Dalen (2007) and Eva van dalen (a real cutie)

In 1997 Van Dalen received a teaching certificate and has taught ever since. Since he 2003 he also engages in education management and consulting. Alongside, he coaches youth teams at VV Drechtstreek.

References

1979 births
Living people
People from Papendrecht
ASWH players
FC Dordrecht players
TOP Oss players
Dutch educators
Association football midfielders
Dutch footballers
Footballers from South Holland